Robert Jacobus Petzer (born ) is a South African rugby union player for Rugby ATL of the Major League Rugby (MLR) in the United States.

He previously played for the Glendale Raptors in the MLR. His regular position is fly-half.

Rugby career

He then moved to Kimberley, where he was selected in the ' Craven Week squad in 2014.

He represented them in the 2016 Under-20 Provincial Championship, finishing as the competition's third highest points scorer with 111 points.

A few weeks later, injuries to a number of ' Pro14 fly-halves — with Niel Marais, Fred Zeilinga, Ernst Stapelberg and Ryno Eksteen all injured — Petzer was called up into the squad and he started their second ever match, an 18–51 defeat to Irish side  in Limerick, with Petzer scoring eight of his side's points. While that was his last action in the Pro14, he made a further 3 starts for in the Currie Cup competition.

He spent one season there before joining Major League Rugby side Glendale Raptors.

References

1996 births
Living people
Cheetahs (rugby union) players
Expatriate rugby union players in the United States
Free State Cheetahs players
Griffons (rugby union) players
People from Parys
Rugby union fly-halves
Rugby union fullbacks
South African expatriate rugby union players
South African expatriate sportspeople in the United States
SWD Eagles players
American Raptors players
Rugby ATL players
Pumas (Currie Cup) players
Rugby union centres
Rugby union players from the Free State (province)